Brain Eraser is the debut studio album of Bewitched, released in 1990 by No.6 Records.

Track listing

Personnel 
Adapted from the Brain Eraser liner notes.

Bewitched
Bob Bert – vocals, drums
Donna Croughn – violin
DJ David Cream of Wheat P – turntables
Jim Fu – electric guitar
Chris Ward – bass guitar
Additional musicians
 Tad Doyle – spoken word (5)
 Thurston Moore – spoken word (5)

Production and additional personnel
Bewitched – production
Art Bykaz – illustrations
Günter Pauler – mastering
Jon Soto – photography
Wharton Tiers – engineering

Release history

References

External links 
 

1990 debut albums
Bewitched (American band) albums
Rough Trade Records albums